Play Around the Christmas Tree is the fourth album and the only Christmas album by Swedish singing group Play.

Track listing
"Sleigh Ride" – 3:24
"Winter Wonderland" – 2:03
"O Holy Night" – 3:38
"Let It Snow" – 1:48
"Rudolph the Red Nosed Reindeer" – 1:54
"Silver Bells" –2:10
"Rockin' Around the Christmas Tree" – 2:07
"The Christmas Song" – 3:13
"All I Want for Christmas Is You" – 3:55
"Silent Night" – 3:04

Personnel
Anaïs Lameche – lead vocals
Janet Leon – lead vocals
Rosie Munter – backing vocals
Anna Sundstrand – backing vocals

Play (Swedish group) albums
2004 Christmas albums
Christmas albums by Swedish artists
Pop Christmas albums